Jessica Lee is a British politician. 

Jessica Lee may also refer to:
Jessica Lee (cyclist) (born 1990), Hong Kong cyclist
Jessica Lee (figure skater) (born 1999), American figure skater
Jessica Lee (model), American model
Jessica J. Lee, Canadian author and environmental historian
Jessica Y. Lee,  American dentist

See also
Jessica Lee Rose (born 1987), American-New Zealand actress
Jessica Lee Goldyn (born 1985), American actress
Jesse Lee (disambiguation)
Jessie Lee (disambiguation)
Jess Lee (disambiguation)